George W. Malone (1890–1961) was a U.S. Senator from Nevada from 1947 to 1959. Senator Malone may also refer to:

Percy Malone (born 1942), Arkansas State Senate
Vernon Malone (1931–2009), North Carolina State Senate

See also
Senator Maloney (disambiguation)